Ischiopsopha are beetles from the subfamily Cetoniinae, tribe Schizorhinini. The genus was created by Raffaello Gestro in 1874. The type species of the genus is Cetonia bifasciata Quoy & Gaimard, 1824. These cetoniids have the tip of the scutellum visible. The genus is spread throughout the whole Australian region.

Species and subspecies 

 Ischiopsopha antoinei Allard, 1995
 Ischiopsopha arouensis (J. Thomson, 1857)
 Ischiopsopha arthuri Audureau, 2000
 Ischiopsopha asperipennis Miksic, 1978
 Ischiopsopha aurora (Kraatz, 1898)
 Ischiopsopha bennigseni Moser, 1906
 Ischiopsopha bifasciata (Quoy & Gaimard, 1824)
 Ischiopsopha blancbonnet Allard, 1995
 Ischiopsopha bonnetblanc Allard, 1995
 Ischiopsopha bruyni Lansberge, 1880
 Ischiopsopha cambodiensis (Wallace, 1867)
 Ischiopsopha carminata Devecis, 2008
 Ischiopsopha ceramensis (Wallace, 1867)
 Ischiopsopha clarki Allard, 1995
 Ischiopsopha chaminadei Antoine, 2004
 Ischiopsopha chuai Rigout, 1997
 Ischiopsopha concina (Wallace, 1867)
 Ischiopsopha cupreopyga Moser, 1926
 Ischiopsopha dechambrei Allard, 1995
 Ischiopsopha dives Gestro, 1876
 Ischiopsopha durvilli (Burmeister, 1842)
 Ischiopsopha emarginata Ritsema, 1879
 Ischiopsopha erratica Krikken, 1983
 Ischiopsopha esmeralda (Wallace, 1867)
 Ischiopsopha gagatina Heller, 1899
 Ischiopsopha gestroi Van der Poll, 1886
 Ischiopsopha harti  Alexis & Delpont, 2000
 Ischiopsopha helleri Moser, 1906
 Ischiopsopha hoyoisi Rigout, 1997
 Ischiopsopha hudsoni Heller, 1894
 Ischiopsopha kerleyi Allard, 1995
 Ischiopsopha kuehbandneri Allard, 1995
 Ischiopsopha ignipennis Gestro, 1876
 Ischiopsopha inequalis  Alexis & Delpont, 2000
 Ischiopsopha jamesi Waterhouse, 1876
 Ischiopsopha kerleyi Allard, 1995
 Ischiopsopha laglaizei (Lansberge, 1879)
 Ischiopsopha laglaizei allardi Delpont, 1995
 Ischiopsopha laglaizei cuprea Moser, 1906
 Ischiopsopha landfordi Allard, 1995
 Ischiopsopha latreille (Gory & Percheron, 1833)
 Ischiopsopha lucivorax Kraatz, 1890
 Ischiopsopha lucivorax buloloensis  Alexis & Delpont, 2000
 Ischiopsopha macfarlanei Heller, 1895
 Ischiopsopha meeki Krikken, 1983
 Ischiopsopha minettii Allard, 1995
 Ischiopsopha nigroloba Ritsema, 1879
 Ischiopsopha nigroloba soucioui  Alexis & Delpont, 2000
 Ischiopsopha nosdhuhi  Alexis & Delpont, 2000
 Ischiopsopha obiensis Miksic, 1976
 Ischiopsopha olivacea (J. Thomson, 1860)
 Ischiopsopha olivacea ulricae (Mohnike, 1871)
 Ischiopsopha plana (Paykull, 1817)
 Ischiopsopha poggii Allard, 1995
 Ischiopsopha pulchripes (J. Thomson, 1877)
 Ischiopsopha purpureitarsis Moser, 1912
 Ischiopsopha ritsemae  Van der Poll, 1886
 Ischiopsopha ritsemae celebensis Allard, 1995
 Ischiopsopha rugata (Blanchard, 1842)
 Ischiopsopha ruteri Allard, 1995
 Ischiopsopha samuelsoni Rigout, 1997
 Ischiopsopha samuelsoni mundaensis Rigout, 1997
 Ischiopsopha scheini Schürhoff, 1942
 Ischiopsopha similis Kraatz, 1895
 Ischiopsopha sticheri Delpont, 2009
 Ischiopsopha striolatissima Delpont, 1995
 Ischiopsopha tibialis Kraatz, 1895
 Ischiopsopha tomiensis Schürhoff, 1934
 Ischiopsopha uhligi Allard, 1995
 Ischiopsopha uliasica Krikken, 1983
 Ischiopsopha utakwa Krikken, 1983
 Ischiopsopha vicina Moser, 1908
 Ischiopsopha violacea Janson, 1917
 Ischiopsopha wallacei (J. Thomson, 1857)
 Ischiopsopha wallacei yorkiana (Janson, 1877)
 Ischiopsopha wallisiana (J. Thomson, 1860)
 Ischiopsopha wallisiana salomonensis Schürhoff, 1934
 Ischiopsopha willemsteini Allard, 1995
 Ischiopsopha willemsteini kainantuensis Allard, 1995
 Ischiopsopha yapasbouf Rigout, 1997

The details of the paramers have been published in the volume 24 of The Beetles of the World, together with a general distribution map.

References 
  1. Alexis & Delpont, 2000, Description de sept nouvelles espèces et de deux sous espèces..., Lambillionea, C, pp. 53–68
  2. Allard (V.), 1995, The Beetles of the World, volume 24, Sciences Nat, Venette 
  3. Antoine (Ph.), 2004, Contribution à l'étude des Schizorhinini..., Coléoptères, 10(7), pp. 75–89
  4. Audureau (A.), 2000, Description de deux nouvelles espèces de Cetoniidae d'Irian Jaya, Lambillionea, C, pp. 388–390
  5. Delpont (M.), 1995, Contribution à l'étude du genre Ischiopsopha Gestro 1874. Description de trois nouvelles espèces, Lambillionea, XCV, pp. 255–259
  6. Delpont (M.), 2009, Nouveau Cetoniidarum. 3. Ischiopsopha sticheri sp. nov., Lambillionea, CIX, pp. 243–244
  7. Devecis (J.), 2008, Ischiopsopha carminata, nouvelle espèce de Cetoniidae d'Irian Jaya, Cetoniimania, 5ème année, pp. 71–76
  8. Rigout (J.) et Allard (V.), 1997, The Beetles of the World, volume 25, Hillside Books, Canterbury 

Cetoniinae